Michael Bruce McKenzie (born 3 July 1967) is an Australian former long-distance freestyle swimmer who represented Australia at the 1988 Summer Olympics in Seoul, South Korea.  He came 11th in the 1500m freestyle with a time of 15:19.34 in the qualifying heats.

He was an Australian Institute of Sport scholarship holder.

See also
 List of Commonwealth Games medallists in swimming (men)

References

External links
 Australian Olympic Committee

1967 births
Living people
Australian male freestyle swimmers
Olympic swimmers of Australia
Swimmers at the 1986 Commonwealth Games
Swimmers at the 1988 Summer Olympics
Commonwealth Games medallists in swimming
Commonwealth Games silver medallists for Australia
20th-century Australian people
21st-century Australian people
Medallists at the 1986 Commonwealth Games